Music Together is a musical education program for children aged newborn through second grade. First offered to the public in 1987, the program is now offered in over 3000 communities in the United States, as well as over 40 other countries around the world. This expansion has been accomplished through independent centers which are licensed to use the program. All teachers must attend and pass a Music Together teacher training.

Since its inception, Music Together has emphasized the importance of having parents and caregivers actively participate in class with their children. This is based in part on the work of early childhood educator Lilian Katz, who noted that while children can learn skills and knowledge from any adult, they learn dispositions only from their loved ones; by participating in class as musical role-models, parents and caregivers help impart to their children the disposition to become lifelong music-makers.

Philosophy
Music Together starts with the premise that all children are musical, and that they can achieve basic music competence provided their music environment is sufficiently rich. All class activities are based on Developmentally Appropriate Practice, an approach to learning that takes into account how children really learn at different developmental stages in their lives. Because very young children learn primarily through play, the program provides a fun, relaxed environment with a nonformal teaching approach.

Some critics of this and other early childhood music programs have questioned whether an organized class is necessary to teach children a basic life skill such as singing. However, children can no longer reliably learn music skills from their surrounding environment, as they could several generations ago, due to a steady decrease in live music-making activities available to them. A study done by Levinowitz  showed that fewer than 50% of first-graders could sing in tune.

Music learning is in many ways analogous to language learning; just as the child seems to teach their self language through interacting with a language environment, they teach their self music through being in a music environment. When adults model active singing and movement behaviors, the child imitates and learns. The combination of classroom activities and at-home music-making inspired by a recording and songbook help children learn music skills naturally and effortlessly.

Repertoire and recordings
Music Together is noted for a repertoire which emphasizes the use of a wide variety of musical modes (tonalities) and metres. With much of the music of our culture—especially “children’s music”—using predominantly major scales and duple metre, it is difficult for children to gain a breadth of music experience. The Music Together repertoire includes songs in such tonalities as Phrygian mode, aeolian mode, Mixolydian mode, and Dorian mode. Children are also introduced to songs using triple metre and “unusual” metres such as 5/4 or 7/8. In this way, the Music Together repertoire helps strengthen children’s audiation, a termed coined by learning theorist Edwin Gordon to describe the process by which we mentally hear and comprehend music. The ability to audiate is essential to any meaningful music learning.

There are nine non-sequential Music Together song collections, named Bongos, Bells, Triangle, Fiddle, Drum, Tambourine, Flutes, Sticks and Maracas, forming a three-year cycle taught in fall, winter, and spring semesters. There are also three summer collections, originally named Summer Songs I, Summer Songs II, and Summer Songs III but in 2019 renamed Harmonica, Banjo and Kazoo respectively, which are compilations carefully designed not to include songs from the spring collections before them or the fall collections after them. Families receive one CD and a code to download all of the songs each semester, along with an accompanying illustrated songbook, to facilitate at-home family music-making. The recordings are professionally produced and richly orchestrated, and feature a “family” of singers, representing a mother, father, child, grandmother, and uncle.

History
Music Together was founded by Kenneth K. Guilmartin, a composer and musician certified in Dalcroze Eurhythmics. In 1985 Guilmartin founded the Center for Music and Young Children (CMYC) to research and develop early childhood music programs for Birch Tree Group, Ltd., publishers of the Suzuki Method.

In 1986 Guilmartin began to collaborate with Lili M. Levinowitz, Ph.D., at that time a doctoral student directing the Children’s Music Development Program at Temple University. Levinowitz was a student of learning theorist Edwin Gordon, known for his Music Learning Theory. Guilmartin and Levinowitz were influenced by Gordon’s work, and included tonal patterns and rhythm patterns based on his work in their new program.

Music Together was first offered to the public in 1987 in a suburb of Philadelphia. After a brief residence at Westminster Conservatory of Music in Princeton, NJ, the company moved to a studio on Nassau Street in Princeton in 1989, the same year that it offered its first teacher training. In 1997, the year of its tenth anniversary, the company moved to 66 Witherspoon St. in Princeton, with room for its lab school as well as offices. In 2006, the company moved into a newly renovated  building in Hopewell, NJ, just outside Princeton.

See also
 Developmentally Appropriate Musical Practice (DAMP), a series of musical experiences for young children (birth through age 8).

References

Further reading
Guilmartin, Kenneth K., and Lili M. Levinowitz. Music and Your Child: A Guide for Parents and Caregivers. Princeton, NJ: Center for Music and Young Children, 1989.

External links
 Music Together: Official website

Early childhood education
Early childhood education in the United States
Music education organizations
Children's arts organizations